Rukarara Hydroelectric Power Station is a  hydroelectric power station in Rwanda.

Location

Overview
The 9.6 MW power plant was constructed in several stages. The first stage, with capacity of 6.9 MW, completed in 2011. The second stage, with capacity of 2.2 MW was completed in 2014. The construction costs for the entire power station was US$13.12 million, with funding provided by the government of Rwanda, the European Union and the  Belgian Development Agency.

Other considerations
The power generated is evacuated via a new sub-station at Rukarara and via a new high voltage power line from Rukarara to Kirinda.

See also

List of power stations in Rwanda
List of hydroelectric power stations in Africa
List of hydroelectric power stations

References

External links
 Lack of funds, capacity may delay Rwanda energy targets

Hydroelectric power stations in Rwanda
Energy infrastructure completed in 2011
2011 establishments in Rwanda
Dams in Rwanda